The 1956 Giro di Lombardia was the 50th edition of the Giro di Lombardia cycle race and was held on 21 October 1956. The race started and finished in Milan. The race was won by André Darrigade of the Bianchi team.

General classification

Notes

References

1956
1956 in road cycling
1956 in Italian sport
1956 Challenge Desgrange-Colombo